Richard Frankensteen (March 6, 1907 in Detroit – 1977) was the first president of the "Automotive Industrial Workers Association" which merged into the United Auto Workers (UAW) He was elected vice-president of the UAW, where he played a major role until he was ousted in 1947. Although never a Communist Party member, he was a leader of the leftwing coalition led by R. J. Thomas and George P. Addes. It opposed to Walter Reuther, who defeated them in 1947. 

Frankensteen attended Central High School, named to the all-city and all-state high school football teams and earned All-American honors in his senior year at University of Dayton.

Beginning at age 15, he worked summers at the Dodge Brothers' plant for more than six years.  After an intended career of teaching and high school football coaching in Ohio was crushed by the Depression, he returned home to Detroit to work full-time with Dodge, and studied law at night at the University of Detroit.  He rose to the bargaining council of the company union at the Dodge plant, and later became leader of the movement that reorganized it into an independent union.

He was defeated for mayor of Detroit in 1945. He was aligned with UAW faction that was finally defeated by Walter Reuther. He left union activity and became a corporate consultant.

Frankensteen married Grace Callahan and they had three children:  Carol Lee Vitale, Marilyn St. Cyr Fekety, and Richard T. Frankensteen, Jr. (Rick).

See also
 The Battle of the Overpass
 Communists in the U.S. Labor Movement (1937-1950)
 Walter Reuther

Sources
 Barnard, John,  American Vanguard: A History of the United Auto Workers, 1935–1970 (2004) passim.
 Doody, Colleen. Detroit's Cold War: The Origins of Postwar Conservatism (2017) excerpt
 Fink, Gary M. Biographical Dictionary of American Labor Leaders(Greenwood Press, 1974). p. 112.
 Goode, Bill. Infighting in the UAW: The 1946 Election and the Ascendancy of Walter Reuther (Greenwood, 1994) online also see  online review
 Halpern, Martin. UAW Politics in the Cold War Era (SUNY Press, 1988) online

 Kraus, Henry. Heroes of Unwritten Story: The UAW, 1934–1939 (University of Illinois Press, 1993). 

 Lichtenstein, Nelson. Walter Reuther: The Most Dangerous Man in Detroit (1995). a major scholarly biography; online

 https://archive.today/20130102143916/http://info.detnews.com/history/story/index.cfm?id=119&category=people

1907 births
American trade union leaders
University of Dayton alumni
University of Detroit Mercy alumni
1977 deaths
Dayton Flyers football players
Trade unionists from Michigan